Vestreno is a comune (municipality) in the Province of Lecco in the Italian region Lombardy, located about  north of Milan and about  north of Lecco.

Vestreno borders the following municipalities: Dervio, Dorio, Sueglio.

Demographic evolution

References

Cities and towns in Lombardy